The 2019 FIVB Volleyball Women's Challenger Cup is the second edition of the FIVB Volleyball Women's Challenger Cup, an annual women's international volleyball tournament contested by 6 national teams that acts as a qualifier for the FIVB Volleyball Women's Nations League.This tournament was held in Lima, Peru.

The winner won the right to participate in the 2022 Nations League replacing Bulgaria, the last placed challenger team after the 2019 edition and the title holder.

Qualification

Pools composition
Teams will be seeded following the serpentine system according to their FIVB World Ranking as of 21 October 2018. FIVB reserved the right to seed the hosts as head of pool A regardless of the World Ranking. Rankings are shown in brackets except the hosts who ranked 27th.

Squads

Venue
 Coliseo Manuel Bonilla, Lima, Peru

Pool standing procedure
 Number of matches won
 Match points
 Sets ratio
 Points ratio
 Result of the last match between the tied teams

Match won 3–0 or 3–1: 3 match points for the winner, 0 match points for the loser
Match won 3–2: 2 match points for the winner, 1 match point for the loser

Preliminary round
All times are Peru Time (UTC-05:00).

Pool A

|}

|}

Pool B

|}

|}

Final round
All times are Peru Time (UTC-05:00).

Semifinals
|}

3rd place match
|}

Final
|}

Final standing

See also
2019 FIVB Volleyball Women's Nations League
2019 FIVB Volleyball Men's Challenger Cup
2019 FIVB Volleyball Men's Nations League

References

External links
Fédération Internationale de Volleyball – official website
FIVB Volleyball Challenger Cup  – official website

FIVB Volleyball Women's Challenger Cup
FIVB
FIVB
FIVB
International volleyball competitions hosted by Peru
Sports competitions in Lima
2010s in Lima